The 2018–19 season was the 95th season in the existence of AEK Athens F.C. and the 58th competitive season and fourth consecutive in the top flight of Greek football. They competed in the Super League, the Greek Cup and the Champions League. The season began on 8 August 2018 and finished on 11 May 2019.

Events
 May 25, 2018 Manolo Jiménez decides against renewing his contract in order to return to Spain and take over Las Palmas in order to be closer to his family.
 May 25, 2018 Marinos Ouzounidis becomes the new head coach of AEK.
 June 26, 2018 Christos Albanis joins AEK from Apollon Smyrnis on a three-year deal.
 June 26, 2018 Makis Giannikoglou joins AEK from PAS Giannina signing three-year deal.
 June 28, 2018 Marios Oikonomou joins AEK on loan from Bologna.
 June 29, 2018 Marko Livaja signs a three-year contract joining AEK permanently having spent last season on loan from Las Palmas.
 July 2, 2018 Vladimir Matijašević becomes the new Sports Director of AEK.

Players

Squad information

NOTE: The players are the ones that have been announced by the AEK Athens' press release. No edits should be made unless a player arrival or exit is announced. Updated 30 June 2019, 23:59 UTC+3.

Transfers

In

Summer

Winter

Out

Summer

Winter

Loan in

Summer

Loan out

Summer

Winter

Renewals

Notes

 a.  AEK Athens enabled the player's buy-out clause, prematurely. The player's loan was expiring at 30 June 2019.

Overall transfer activity

Expenditure
Summer:  €2,900,000

Winter:  €1,200,000

Total:  €4,100,000

Income
Summer:  €3,200,000

Winter:  €0

Total:  €3,200,000

Net Totals
Summer:  €300,000

Winter:  €1,200,000

Total:  €900,000

Pre-season and friendlies

Super League

League table

Results summary

Results by Matchday

Fixtures

Greek Cup

Group B

Matches

Group stage

Round of 16

Quarter-finals

Semi-finals

Final

UEFA Champions League

AEK Athens entered the Champions League at the third qualifying round.

Third Qualifying Round
On 1 August, AEK Athens were drawn against Celtic.

Play-Off Round
On 16 August, AEK Athens were drawn against MOL Vidi (Hungary).

Group stage
On 30 August, the draw for the 2018–19 UEFA Champions League Group stage was made. AEK Athens were drawn in Group E along with Bayern Munich (Pot 1), Benfica (Pot 2) and Ajax (Pot 3).

Statistics

Squad statistics

! colspan="11" style="background:#FFDE00; text-align:center" | Goalkeepers
|-

! colspan="11" style="background:#FFDE00; color:black; text-align:center;"| Defenders
|-

! colspan="11" style="background:#FFDE00; color:black; text-align:center;"| Midfielders
|-

! colspan="11" style="background:#FFDE00; color:black; text-align:center;"| Forwards
|-

! colspan="11" style="background:#FFDE00; color:black; text-align:center;"| Left during Winter Transfer Window
|-

|-
|}

Disciplinary record

|-
! colspan="17" style="background:#FFDE00; text-align:center" | Goalkeepers

|-
! colspan="17" style="background:#FFDE00; color:black; text-align:center;"| Defenders

|-
! colspan="17" style="background:#FFDE00; color:black; text-align:center;"| Midfielders

|-
! colspan="17" style="background:#FFDE00; color:black; text-align:center;"| Forwards

|-
! colspan="17" style="background:#FFDE00; color:black; text-align:center;"| Left during Winter Transfer window

|-
|}

Starting 11

Goalscorers

References

External links
AEK Athens F.C. Official Website

AEK Athens F.C. seasons
AEK Athens
AEK Athens